Cellulomonas denverensis is a bacterium from the genus Cellulomonas which has been isolated from human blood in the United States.

References

 

Micrococcales
Bacteria described in 2005